is a former Japanese tennis player. She is the older sister of professional tennis player Erika Sema.

Yurika, whose mother is Japanese and her father is French, achieved her career-high singles ranking of world No. 142, on 30 November 2009 and best doubles ranking of No. 150 on 19 April 2010.

She announced that she would play her last tournament at the 90th All-Japan Championships, in November 2015 before retirement.

ITF Circuit finals

Singles: 16 (3 titles, 13 runner-ups)

Doubles: 27 (14 titles, 13 runner-ups)

References

External links

 
 
 Official blog (Japanese)

1986 births
Living people
Japanese female tennis players
Japanese people of French descent
People from Nerima
Asian Games medalists in tennis
Tennis players at the 2010 Asian Games
Medalists at the 2010 Asian Games
Asian Games bronze medalists for Japan
21st-century Japanese women